A trust or corporate trust is a large grouping of business interests with significant market power, which may be embodied as a corporation or as a group of corporations that cooperate with one another in various ways. These ways can include constituting a trade association, owning stock in one another, constituting a corporate group (sometimes specifically a conglomerate), or combinations thereof. The term trust is often used in a historical sense to refer to monopolies or near-monopolies in the United States during the Second Industrial Revolution in the 19th century and early 20th century. The use of corporate trusts during this period is the historical reason for the name "antitrust law".

In the broader sense of the term, relating to trust law, a trust is a centuries-old legal arrangement whereby one party conveys legal possession and title of certain property to a second party, called a trustee. While that trustee has ownership, they cannot use the property for herself, but holds it 'in trust' for the well-being of a beneficiary. Trusts are commonly used to hold inheritances for the benefit of children and other family members, for example. In business, such trusts, with corporate entities as the trustees, have sometimes been used to combine several large businesses in order to exert complete control over a market, which is how the narrower sense of the term grew out of the broader sense.

In the United States, the use of corporate trusts died out in the early 20th century as U.S. states passed laws making it easier to create new corporations.

History 
The OED dates use of the word trust in a business organization sense from 1825.

The business or "corporate" trust came into use in the 19th-century United States as a legal device to consolidate industrial activity across state lines. In 1882 John D. Rockefeller and other owners of Standard Oil faced several obstacles to managing and profiting from their large oil refining business. The existing approach of owning and dealing with several companies in each state was unwieldy, often resulting in turf battles and non-uniform practices. Furthermore, the Pennsylvania legislature proposed to tax out-of-state corporations on their entire business activity. Concerned that other states could follow, Standard Oil had its attorney  Samuel C. T. Dodd adapt the common law instrument of a trust to avoid cross-state taxation and to impose a single management hierarchy.
The Standard Oil Trust formed pursuant to a trust agreement in which the individual shareholders of many separate corporations agreed to convey their shares to the trust; it ended up entirely owning 14 corporations and also exercised majority control over 26 others.  Nine individuals held trust certificates and acted as the trust's board of trustees. One of those trustees, Rockefeller himself, held 41% of the trust certificates; the next most powerful trustee held about 13%. This trust became a model for other industries.

An 1888 article explained the difference between trusts in the traditional sense and the new corporate trusts:

Although such corporate trusts were initially set up to improve the organization of large businesses, they soon faced widespread accusations of abusing their market power to engage in anticompetitive business practices (in order to establish and maintain monopolies).  Such accusations caused the term trust to become strongly associated with such practices among the American public and led to the enactment in 1890 of the Sherman Antitrust Act, the first U.S. federal competition statute.

Meanwhile, trust agreements, the legal instruments used to create the corporate trusts, received a hostile reception in state courts during the 1880s and were quickly phased out in the 1890s in favor of other devices like holding companies for maintaining corporate control. For example, the Standard Oil Trust terminated its own trust agreement in March 1892. Regardless, the name stuck, and American competition laws are known today as antitrust laws as a result of the historical public aversion to trusts, while other countries use the term competition laws instead.

In 1898 President William McKinley launched the trust-busting era when he appointed the U.S. Industrial Commission. Theodore Roosevelt seized upon the commission's report and based much of his presidency (1901–1909) on trust-busting.

Prominent trusts included:

 Standard Oil
 U.S. Steel
 the American Tobacco Company
 the International Mercantile Marine Company
 the match companies controlled by Ivar Kreuger, the Match King

Other companies also formed trusts, such as the Motion Picture Patents Company or Edison Trust which controlled the movie patents. Patents were also important to the Bell Telephone Company, as indicated by the massive litigation that came to be known as The Telephone Cases.

See also
Chaebol
Keiretsu
Trust company

References

Bibliography
 
 Boudreaux, Donald J., and Thomas J. Dilorenzo. "The Protectionist Roots of Antitrust  " The Review of Austrian Economics 6, no. 2 (1993): 81–96.
 Barak Orbach and Grace Campbell, The Antitrust Curse of Bigness, Southern California Law Review (2012).

External links 
 
 

Business models
Monopoly (economics)